Aleksandr Vitalyevich Golovnya (born 20 October 1959) is a Soviet former professional footballer.

Club career
He made his professional debut in the Soviet Second League in 1976 for Mashinostroitel Gomel.

Honours
 Soviet Top League runner-up: 1986.
 Soviet Cup winner: 1984.
 Soviet Cup runner-up: 1990 (played in the early stages of the 1989/90 tournament for FC Lokomotiv Moscow).

European club competitions
With FC Dynamo Moscow.

 UEFA Cup 1982–83: 2 games.
 European Cup Winners' Cup 1984–85: 7 games.

References

1959 births
Living people
People from Mazyr
Soviet footballers
Belarusian footballers
Association football defenders
Soviet expatriate footballers
Soviet Union youth international footballers
Expatriate soccer players in the United States
Soviet Top League players
Soviet First League players
Soviet Second League players
FC Gomel players
FC Dinamo Minsk players
FC Dynamo Moscow players
FC Lokomotiv Moscow players
Orlando Lions players
San Diego Sockers (original MISL) players
Sportspeople from Gomel Region